Montrose is a city in McCook County, South Dakota, United States. The population was 468 at the 2020 census.

History
Montrose was laid out in 1880. Some say the town was named after the novel A Legend of Montrose by Sir Walter Scott, while others believe the name is an amalgamation of "mountain" and "rose", features near the original town site. A post office has been in operation in Montrose since 1880.

Geography
Montrose is located at  (43.699453, -97.185858).

Montrose has been assigned the ZIP code 57048 and the FIPS place code 43500.

Climate

According to the Köppen Climate Classification system, Montrose has a hot-summer humid continental climate, abbreviated "Dfa" on climate maps.

Demographics

2010 census
As of the census of 2010, there were 472 people, 191 households, and 135 families residing in the city. The racial makeup of the city was 97.7% White, 1.1% from other races, and 1.3% from two or more races. Hispanic or Latino of any race were 2.3% of the population.

There were 191 households, of which 35.1% had children under the age of 18 living with them, 59.2% were married couples living together, 8.9% had a female householder with no husband present, 2.6% had a male householder with no wife present, and 29.3% were non-families. 26.2% of all households were made up of individuals, and 14.7% had someone living alone who was 65 years of age or older. The average household size was 2.47 and the average family size was 2.99.

The median age in the city was 37.2 years. 27.8% of residents were under the age of 18; 5% were between the ages of 18 and 24; 28.2% were from 25 to 44; 22.4% were from 45 to 64; and 16.5% were 65 years of age or older. The gender makeup of the city was 46.6% male and 53.4% female.

2000 census
As of the census of 2000, there were 460 people, 195 households, and 124 families residing in the city. The population density was 1,133.7 people per square mile (433.2/km2). There were 202 housing units at an average density of 497.8 per square mile (190.2/km2). The racial makeup of the city was 98.70% White, 0.87% Native American, 0.43% from other races. Hispanic or Latino of any race were 1.09% of the population.

There were 195 households, out of which 26.7% had children under the age of 18 living with them, 53.8% were married couples living together, 6.2% had a female householder with no husband present, and 35.9% were non-families. 31.3% of all households were made up of individuals, and 17.4% had someone living alone who was 65 years of age or older. The average household size was 2.36 and the average family size was 2.98.

In the city, the population was spread out, with 25.0% under the age of 18, 8.3% from 18 to 24, 28.9% from 25 to 44, 18.3% from 45 to 64, and 19.6% who were 65 years of age or older. The median age was 36 years. For every 100 females, there were 88.5 males. For every 100 females age 18 and over, there were 88.5 males.

The median income for a household in the city was $31,250, and the median income for a family was $39,583. Males had a median income of $30,385 versus $19,886 for females. The per capita income for the city was $15,233. About 3.5% of families and 11.8% of the population were below the poverty line, including 8.5% of those under age 18 and 18.9% of those age 65 or over.

Porter Sculpture Park
The Porter Sculpture Park is located outside the Montrose community, not far from I-90. Inside the park there sit 50 giant metal creatures designed by welding extra metal junk together. Of these 50 there is a  longhorn, a giant pink rocking horse, and a magic dragon. It is an example of one man's view of the world.

References

>. March 1, 2010 RV Park Reviews

Cities in South Dakota
Cities in McCook County, South Dakota
Sioux Falls, South Dakota metropolitan area